Volta Star FM is a public radio station in Ho, the capital town of the Volta Region of Ghana. The station is owned and run by the state broadcaster - the Ghana Broadcasting Corporation.

Notable Presenters
Kwame Senyo 
Eric Eli Adzie 
Tilda Acorlor 
King Freeman Xorlali Ntsukpui 
Togbe Akwensi
Kofi Appoh

References

Radio stations in Ghana
Volta Region
Mass media in Ho, Ghana